Qareh Gol-e Olya (also Romanized as Qarah Gol-e ‘Olyā; also known as Garagūā, Qareh Gol, and Qareh Golūl) is a small village in Mishan Rural District, Mahvarmilani District, Mamasani County, Fars Province, Iran. At the 2006 census, its population was only 19, in 7 families.

References 

Populated places in Mamasani County